The College Hills Historic District is a  residential historic district in Shorewood Hills, Wisconsin that was listed on the National Register of Historic Places in 2002.  It includes architect-designed homes by Purcell and Elmslie and other architects among its 114 contributing buildings. Among them is the Prof. Philip M. and Marian Raup House.

Development of the neighborhood began in 1913 when John C. McKenna bought an extent of farmland with views of Lake Mendota and the UW campus and platted it into lots. He advertised his subdivision as "A Neighborhood of High Class Homes," hoping to appeal to the expanding university population. He named the development "College Hills" and named the streets after colleges. The first homes were built starting in 1914, in then-popular styles Prairie School and Craftsman. As styles shifted, later homes were built in various period revival styles.

Non-Madison architects whose work is represented in the district include:
Purcell and Elmslie, who designed the Prof. Harold C. & Josephine Bradley House, at 2914 Oxford Rd.
Ossian Cole Simonds.
J.C. "Cary" Caraway, who designed the Ruedisili home at 2909 Hunter Hill. Caraway was a Taliesin fellow.

Madison architects whose works are included in the district include:
Beatty & Strang
Henry T. Dysland
John J. Flad
Frank S. Moulton
Herbert Fritz, Jr.
Philip M. Homer
William V. Kaeser
Law, Law & Potter
Livermore & Samuelson
Charles E. Marks (b. 1875) "one of the Madison area's best builder-architects"
Frank M. Riley.

Eight photos are included

Photo 1, 2816 Columbia Rd., View looking NW

Photo 2, 1218 Sweetbriar Rd., View looking W. John C. McKenna designed Sweetbriar Road one in first photo
Photo 3, 1102 Dartmouth Rd., View looking WSW. House built in 1916 and designed by Charles E. Marks 
Photo 4, 2914 Oxford Rd., View looking N
photo 5, 2919 Oxford Rd., View looking SE
Photo 6, 1214 Dartmouth Rd., View looking WSW
Photo 7, 1240 Sweetbriar Rd., View looking W
Photo 8,  1206 Dartmouth Rd., View looking

References

Houses on the National Register of Historic Places in Wisconsin
Prairie School architecture in Wisconsin
Geography of Dane County, Wisconsin
Historic districts on the National Register of Historic Places in Wisconsin
Houses in Dane County, Wisconsin
National Register of Historic Places in Dane County, Wisconsin